National Political Institutes of Education (officially abbreviated NPEA, commonly abbreviated Napola for Nationalpolitische Lehranstalt meaning National Political Teaching Institute) were secondary boarding schools in Nazi Germany. They were founded as ‘community education sites’ after the National Socialist seizure of power in 1933.

Mission
The main task of the NPEA was the "education of national socialists, efficient in body and soul for the service to the people and the state". The pupils attending these schools were meant to become the future leadership of Germany- political, administrative, and military. Until the beginning of World War II on 1 September 1939, the Napolas served as strong politically-accentuated elite preparatory schools within the framework of the general higher education system. During the war, they increasingly developed into preparatory schools for entry into the Wehrmacht and Waffen-SS. In keeping with their unique nature, Napola schools operated separate from all other German secondary schools.

Overview
The Napolas were largely modelled on English public schools such as Eton and Harrow, seen as "character-forming" role models. The British schools had been educating "the rulers of the centuries-old British empire", and the Napolas "should train the rulers of the 'thousand-year Reich'". The Napolas were more effective at indoctrinating pupils politically than organisations such as the Hitler Youth; children attended from a younger age, and mixed little with other children. In the years before war between Britain and Germany there were a great many exchanges between British public schools and Napolas.

The first three NPEAs were founded in 1933 by the Minister of Education Bernhard Rust in Plön, Potsdam and Köslin. The schools responded directly to the Reich Ministry for Education, rather than to any state like regular schools. From 1936, the NPEAs were subordinated to the Inspector of the National Political Institutes of Education, SS-Obergruppenführer August Heissmeyer. From August 1940 onward, they were part of the Hauptamt Dienststelle Heissmeyer and the schools came under the direct influence of the SS, which supplied and supported them. The goal of the schools was to train future leaders, and especially given the influence of the SS, it was hoped that graduates would choose a career in the SS or police. By 1941 there were 30 NPEAs with 6,000 pupils enrolled throughout Nazi Germany. The schools were gender-segregated, and only a few girls-only schools. In 1942, out of the 33 Napola schools that were operating, just three were for girls. By the end of the war in 1945, 43 Napola schools were listed.

For boys aged 10–14 years the uniform of the Deutsches Jungvolk (German Youngfolk) was used. For those aged 14–18 years the uniform of the Hitler Youth was used. The rank structure corresponded with that of those two organizations. Heissmeyer considered introducing uniforms and ranks similar to the SS among pupils and teachers but ultimately kept the Hitler Youth organizational structure.

Due to the highly militaristic nature of Nazi Germany, life at the NPEAs was dominated by military discipline. Only boys and girls considered to be "racially flawless" were admitted to the schools and no children with poor hearing or vision were accepted. "Above average intelligence" was also required, so that those looking to be admitted had to complete 8-day entrance exams.

Life in boys' Napolas was highly competitive, even brutal. It was extremely hard to get in and nearly as hard to stay. Approximately one fifth of all cadets failed to meet the required standards or were sent home because of injuries sustained in training accidents.

Napola schools were intensely political, deliberately working to make their cadets fervent believers in the Nazi regime and its ideology. This is reflected in the percentage of Jungmannen who eventually entered the SS- 13%, much higher than the 1.8% of the general German population.

The Nazi world view was considered paramount in Napola education. A prominent belief among the cadets themselves was that of "Endsieg" or final victory. This came into play as Germany's fortunes fell into a decline from which they would never recover, and Nazi leadership increasingly scraped the bottom of the barrel for manpower. The privileged students of the Napola schools were mobilized in the final months of the war, serving as poorly equipped and minimally trained but highly motivated infantry. Armed with little more than blind fanaticism, they nonetheless offered fierce resistance in many battles in the last months of the war. Casualties among them were extremely high.

School locations

Well-known former students
Well-known former students of National Political Institutes of Education include:
Heinz Dürr (businessman)
Manfred Ewald (athletic official)
Alfred Herrhausen (businessman)
Horst Janssen (printmaker)
Hellmuth Karasek (journalist and author)
Hardy Krüger (actor)
Johannes Poeppel (general)
Theo Sommer (journalist)
Rüdiger von Wechmar (diplomat)
Heinz Hitler (nephew of Adolf Hitler)

See also
 Adolf Hitler Schools
 Nazi elite schools
 SS-Junker Schools
 SS Education Office

Notes

References

External links

Adolf-Hitler-Schulen

Schools in Germany
Boarding schools in Germany
High schools in Germany
Education in Nazi Germany
Educational institutions established in 1933
1933 establishments in Germany